Meichuan is a town under the administration of the county-level city of Wuxue in extreme eastern Hubei province, China. It lies at the north of the Wuxue city, and was once the administrative center of Guangji County, the predecessor of Wuxue city. Meichuan Reservoir, Meichuan River and some of the south branch of Dabie Mountains locate in Meichuan. Meichuan's main industry includes rice planting, rapeseed planting, beer industry, etc. It is well known for its yam cultivation and production. The most important school in Meichuan is Meichuan Senior High School, which has a history of over 100 years.

Geography

Administrative divisions
, Meichuan administered:

References

Township-level divisions of Hubei